The rings of Saturn are the most extensive ring system of any planet in the Solar System. They consist of countless small particles, ranging in size from micrometers to meters, that orbit around Saturn. The ring particles are made almost entirely of water ice, with a trace component of rocky material. There is still no consensus as to their mechanism of formation. Although theoretical models indicated that the rings were likely to have formed early in the Solar System's history, newer data from Cassini suggested they formed relatively late.

Although reflection from the rings increases Saturn's brightness, they are not visible from Earth with unaided vision. In 1610, the year after Galileo Galilei turned a telescope to the sky, he became the first person to observe Saturn's rings, though he could not see them well enough to discern their true nature. In 1655, Christiaan Huygens was the first person to describe them as a disk surrounding Saturn. The concept that Saturn's rings are made up of a series of tiny ringlets can be traced to Pierre-Simon Laplace, although true gaps are few – it is more correct to think of the rings as an annular disk with concentric local maxima and minima in density and brightness. On the scale of the clumps within the rings there is much empty space.

The rings have numerous gaps where particle density drops sharply: two opened by known moons embedded within them, and many others at locations of known destabilizing orbital resonances with the moons of Saturn. Other gaps remain unexplained. Stabilizing resonances, on the other hand, are responsible for the longevity of several rings, such as the Titan Ringlet and the G Ring.

Well beyond the main rings is the Phoebe ring, which is presumed to originate from Phoebe and thus to share its retrograde orbital motion. It is aligned with the plane of Saturn's orbit. Saturn has an axial tilt of 27 degrees, so this ring is tilted at an angle of 27 degrees to the more visible rings orbiting above Saturn's equator.

History

Early observations 

Galileo Galilei was the first to observe the rings of Saturn in 1610 using his telescope, but was unable to identify them as such. He wrote to the Duke of Tuscany that "The planet Saturn is not alone, but is composed of three, which almost touch one another and never move nor change with respect to one another. They are arranged in a line parallel to the zodiac, and the middle one (Saturn itself) is about three times the size of the lateral ones." He also described the rings as Saturn's "ears". In 1612 the Earth passed through the plane of the rings and they became invisible. Mystified, Galileo remarked "I do not know what to say in a case so surprising, so unlooked for and so novel." He mused, "Has Saturn swallowed his children?" — referring to the myth of the Titan Saturn devouring his offspring to forestall the prophecy of them overthrowing him. He was further confused when the rings again became visible in 1613.

Early astronomers used anagrams as a form of commitment scheme to lay claim to new discoveries before their results were ready for publication. Galileo used the anagram "" for Altissimum planetam tergeminum observavi ("I have observed the most distant planet to have a triple form") for discovering the rings of Saturn.

In 1657 Christopher Wren became Professor of Astronomy at Gresham College, London. He had been making observations of the planet Saturn from around 1652 with the aim of explaining its appearance. His hypothesis was written up in De corpore saturni, in which he came close to suggesting the planet had a ring. However, Wren was unsure whether the ring was independent of the planet, or physically attached to it. Before Wren's theory was published Christiaan Huygens presented his theory of the rings of Saturn. Immediately Wren recognised this as a better hypothesis than his own and De corpore saturni was never published. Robert Hooke was another early observer of the rings of Saturn, and noted the casting of shadows on the rings.

Huygens' ring theory and later developments 

Huygens began grinding lenses with his brother Constantijn in 1655 and was able to observe Saturn with greater detail using a 43× power refracting telescope that he designed himself. He was the first to suggest that Saturn was surrounded by a ring detached from the planet, and famously published the anagram: "". Three years later, he revealed it to mean Annuto cingitur, tenui, plano, nusquam coherente, ad eclipticam inclinato ("[Saturn] is surrounded by a thin, flat, ring, nowhere touching, inclined to the ecliptic"). He published his ring theory in Systema Saturnium (1659) which also included his discovery of Saturn's moon, Titan, as well as the first clear outline of the dimensions of the Solar System.

In 1675, Giovanni Domenico Cassini determined that Saturn's ring was composed of multiple smaller rings with gaps between them; the largest of these gaps was later named the Cassini Division. This division is a  region between the A ring and B Ring.

In 1787, Pierre-Simon Laplace proved that a uniform solid ring would be unstable and suggested that the rings were composed of a large number of solid ringlets.

In 1859, James Clerk Maxwell demonstrated that a nonuniform solid ring, solid ringlets or a continuous fluid ring would also not be stable, indicating that the ring must be composed of numerous small particles, all independently orbiting Saturn. Later, Sofia Kovalevskaya also found that Saturn's rings cannot be liquid ring-shaped bodies. Spectroscopic studies of the rings which were carried out independently in 1895 by James Keeler of the Allegheny Observatory and by Aristarkh Belopolsky of the Pulkovo Observatory showed that Maxwell's analysis was correct.

Four robotic spacecraft have observed Saturn's rings from the vicinity of the planet. Pioneer 11 was responsible for the discovery of the F ring. A failed photopolarimeter prevented Voyager 1 from observing Saturn's rings at the planned resolution; nevertheless, images from the spacecraft provided unprecedented detail of the ring system and revealed the existence of the G ring. Voyager 2s working photopolarimeter allowed it to observe the ring system at higher resolution than Voyager 1, and to thereby discover many previously unseen ringlets. Cassini spacecraft entered into orbit around Saturn in July 2004. Cassini images of the rings are the most detailed to-date, and are responsible for the discovery of yet more ringlets.

The rings are named alphabetically in the order they were discovered (A and B in 1675 by Giovanni Domenico Cassini, C in 1850 by William Cranch Bond and his son George Phillips Bond, D in 1933 by Nikolai P. Barabachov and B. Semejkin, E in 1967 by Walter A. Feibelman, F in 1979 by Pioneer 11, and G in 1980 by Voyager 1). The main rings are, working outward from the planet, C, B and A, with the Cassini Division, the largest gap, separating Rings B and A. Several fainter rings were discovered more recently. The D Ring is exceedingly faint and closest to the planet. The narrow F Ring is just outside the A Ring. Beyond that are two far fainter rings named G and E. The rings show a tremendous amount of structure on all scales, some related to perturbations by Saturn's moons, but much unexplained.

Saturn's axial inclination 
Saturn's axial tilt is 26.7°, meaning that widely varying views of the rings, of which the visible ones occupy its equatorial plane, are obtained from Earth at different times. Earth makes passes through the ring plane every 13 to 15 years, about every half Saturn year, and there are about equal chances of either a single or three crossings occurring in each such occasion. The most recent ring plane crossings were on 22 May 1995, 10 August 1995, 11 February 1996 and 4 September 2009; upcoming events will occur on 23 March 2025, 15 October 2038, 1 April 2039 and 9 July 2039. Favorable ring plane crossing viewing opportunities (with Saturn not close to the Sun) only come during triple crossings.

Saturn's equinoxes, when the Sun passes through the ring plane, are not evenly spaced; on each orbit the Sun is south of the ring plane for 13.7 Earth years, then north of the plane for 15.7 years. Dates for its northern hemisphere autumnal equinoxes include 19 November 1995 and 6 May 2025, with northern vernal equinoxes on 11 August 2009 and 23 January 2039. During the period around an equinox the illumination of most of the rings is greatly reduced, making possible unique observations highlighting features that depart from the ring plane.

Physical characteristics 

With an estimated local thickness of as little as 10 metres (30') and as much as 1 km (1000 yards), they are composed of 99.9% pure water ice with a smattering of impurities that may include tholins or silicates. The main rings are primarily composed of particles smaller than 10 m.

Cassini directly measured the mass of the ring system via their gravitational effect during its final set of orbits that passed between the rings and the cloud tops, yielding a value of 1.54 (± 0.49) × 1019 kg, or 0.41 ± 0.13 Mimas masses. This is as massive as about half the mass of the Earth's entire Antarctic ice shelf, spread across a surface area 80 times larger than that of Earth. The estimate is close to the value of 0.40 Mimas masses derived from Cassini observations of density waves in the A, B and C rings. It is a small fraction of the total mass of Saturn (about 0.25 ppb). Earlier Voyager observations of density waves in the A and B rings and an optical depth profile had yielded a mass of about 0.75 Mimas masses, with later observations and computer modeling suggesting that was an underestimate.

Although the largest gaps in the rings, such as the Cassini Division and Encke Gap, can be seen from Earth, the Voyager spacecraft discovered that the rings have an intricate structure of thousands of thin gaps and ringlets. This structure is thought to arise, in several different ways, from the gravitational pull of Saturn's many moons. Some gaps are cleared out by the passage of tiny moonlets such as Pan, many more of which may yet be discovered, and some ringlets seem to be maintained by the gravitational effects of small shepherd satellites (similar to Prometheus and Pandora's maintenance of the F ring). Other gaps arise from resonances between the orbital period of particles in the gap and that of a more massive moon further out; Mimas maintains the Cassini Division in this manner. Still more structure in the rings consists of spiral waves raised by the inner moons' periodic gravitational perturbations at less disruptive resonances.
Data from the Cassini space probe indicate that the rings of Saturn possess their own atmosphere, independent of that of the planet itself. The atmosphere is composed of molecular oxygen gas (O2) produced when ultraviolet light from the Sun interacts with water ice in the rings. Chemical reactions between water molecule fragments and further ultraviolet stimulation create and eject, among other things, O2. According to models of this atmosphere, H2 is also present. The O2 and H2 atmospheres are so sparse that if the entire atmosphere were somehow condensed onto the rings, it would be about one atom thick. The rings also have a similarly sparse OH (hydroxide) atmosphere. Like the O2, this atmosphere is produced by the disintegration of water molecules, though in this case the disintegration is done by energetic ions that bombard water molecules ejected by Saturn's moon Enceladus. This atmosphere, despite being extremely sparse, was detected from Earth by the Hubble Space Telescope.
Saturn shows complex patterns in its brightness. Most of the variability is due to the changing aspect of the rings, and this goes through two cycles every orbit. However, superimposed on this is variability due to the eccentricity of the planet's orbit that causes the planet to display brighter oppositions in the northern hemisphere than it does in the southern.

In 1980, Voyager 1 made a fly-by of Saturn that showed the F ring to be composed of three narrow rings that appeared to be braided in a complex structure; it is now known that the outer two rings consist of knobs, kinks and lumps that give the illusion of braiding, with the less bright third ring lying inside them.

New images of the rings taken around the 11 August 2009 equinox of Saturn by NASA's Cassini spacecraft have shown that the rings extend significantly out of the nominal ring plane in a few places.

Formation and evolution of main rings 
Estimates of the age of Saturn's rings vary widely, depending on the approach used. They have been considered to possibly be very old, dating to the formation of Saturn itself. However, data from Cassini suggest they are much younger, having most likely formed within the last 100 million years, and may thus be between 10 million and 100 million years old. This recent origin scenario is based on a new, low mass estimate, modeling of the rings' dynamical evolution, and measurements of the flux of interplanetary dust, which feed into an estimate of the rate of ring darkening over time. Since the rings are continually losing material, they would have been more massive in the past than at present. The mass estimate alone is not very diagnostic, since high mass rings that formed early in the Solar System's history would have evolved by now to a mass close to that measured. Based on current depletion rates, they may disappear in 300 million years.

There are two main theories regarding the origin of Saturn's inner rings. A theory originally proposed by Édouard Roche in the 19th century, is that the rings were once a moon of Saturn (named Veritas, after a Roman goddess who hid in a well). According to the theory the moon's orbit decayed until it was close enough to be ripped apart by tidal forces (see Roche limit). Numerical simulations carried out in 2022 support this theory; the authors of that study proposed the name "Chrysalis" for the destroyed moon. A variation on this theory is that this moon disintegrated after being struck by a large comet or asteroid. The second theory is that the rings were never part of a moon, but are instead left over from the original nebular material from which Saturn formed.

A more traditional version of the disrupted-moon theory is that the rings are composed of debris from a moon 400 to 600 km (200 to 400 miles) in diameter, slightly larger than Mimas. The last time there were collisions large enough to be likely to disrupt a moon that large was during the Late Heavy Bombardment some four billion years ago.

A more recent variant of this type of theory by R. M. Canup is that the rings could represent part of the remains of the icy mantle of a much larger, Titan-sized, differentiated moon that was stripped of its outer layer as it spiraled into the planet during the formative period when Saturn was still surrounded by a gaseous nebula. This would explain the scarcity of rocky material within the rings. The rings would initially have been much more massive (≈1,000 times) and broader than at present; material in the outer portions of the rings would have coalesced into the moons of Saturn out to Tethys, also explaining the lack of rocky material in the composition of most of these moons. Subsequent collisional or cryovolcanic evolution of Enceladus might then have caused selective loss of ice from this moon, raising its density to its current value of 1.61 g/cm3, compared to values of 1.15 for Mimas and 0.97 for Tethys.

The idea of massive early rings was subsequently extended to explain the formation of Saturn's moons out to Rhea. If the initial massive rings contained chunks of rocky material (>100 km; 60 miles across) as well as ice, these silicate bodies would have accreted more ice and been expelled from the rings, due to gravitational interactions with the rings and tidal interaction with Saturn, into progressively wider orbits. Within the Roche limit, bodies of rocky material are dense enough to accrete additional material, whereas less-dense bodies of ice are not. Once outside the rings, the newly formed moons could have continued to evolve through random mergers. This process may explain the variation in silicate content of Saturn's moons out to Rhea, as well as the trend towards less silicate content closer to Saturn. Rhea would then be the oldest of the moons formed from the primordial rings, with moons closer to Saturn being progressively younger.

The brightness and purity of the water ice in Saturn's rings have also been cited as evidence that the rings are much younger than Saturn, as the infall of meteoric dust would have led to a darkening of the rings. However, new research indicates that the B Ring may be massive enough to have diluted infalling material and thus avoided substantial darkening over the age of the Solar System. Ring material may be recycled as clumps form within the rings and are then disrupted by impacts. This would explain the apparent youth of some of the material within the rings. Evidence suggesting a recent origin of the C ring has been gathered by researchers analyzing data from the Cassini Titan Radar Mapper, which focused on analyzing the proportion of rocky silicates within this ring. If much of this material was contributed by a recently disrupted centaur or moon, the age of this ring could be on the order of 100 million years or less. On the other hand, if the material came primarily from micrometeoroid influx, the age would be closer to a billion years.

The Cassini UVIS team, led by Larry Esposito, used stellar occultation to discover 13 objects, ranging from 27 metres (89') to 10 km (6 miles) across, within the F ring. They are translucent, suggesting they are temporary aggregates of ice boulders a few meters across. Esposito believes this to be the basic structure of the Saturnian rings, particles clumping together, then being blasted apart.

Research based on rates of infall into Saturn favors a younger ring system age of hundreds of millions of years. Ring material is continually spiraling down into Saturn; the faster this infall, the shorter the lifetime of the ring system. One mechanism involves gravity pulling electrically charged water ice grains down from the rings along planetary magnetic field lines, a process termed 'ring rain'. This flow rate was inferred to be 432–2870 kg/s using ground-based Keck telescope observations; as a consequence of this process alone, the rings will be gone in ~ million years. While traversing the gap between the rings and planet in September 2017, the Cassini spacecraft detected an equatorial flow of charge-neutral material from the rings to the planet of 4,800–44,000 kg/s. Assuming this influx rate is stable, adding it to the continuous 'ring rain' process implies the rings may be gone in under 100 million years.

Subdivisions and structures within the rings 
The densest parts of the Saturnian ring system are the A and B Rings, which are separated by the Cassini Division (discovered in 1675 by Giovanni Domenico Cassini). Along with the C Ring, which was discovered in 1850 and is similar in character to the Cassini Division, these regions constitute the main rings. The main rings are denser and contain larger particles than the tenuous dusty rings. The latter include the D Ring, extending inward to Saturn's cloud tops, the G and E Rings and others beyond the main ring system. These diffuse rings are characterised as "dusty" because of the small size of their particles (often about a μm); their chemical composition is, like the main rings, almost entirely water ice. The narrow F Ring, just off the outer edge of the A Ring, is more difficult to categorize; parts of it are very dense, but it also contains a great deal of dust-size particles.

Physical parameters of the rings 
Notes:
(1) Names as designated by the International Astronomical Union, unless otherwise noted. Broader separations between named rings are termed divisions, while narrower separations within named rings are called gaps.
(2) Data mostly from the Gazetteer of Planetary Nomenclature, a NASA factsheet and several papers.
(3) distance is to centre of gaps, rings and ringlets that are narrower than 1,000 km (600 miles)
(4) unofficial name

Major subdivisions

C Ring structures

Cassini Division structures 
 Source:

A Ring structures

D Ring 

The D Ring is the innermost ring, and is very faint. In 1980, Voyager 1 detected within this ring three ringlets designated D73, D72 and D68, with D68 being the discrete ringlet nearest to Saturn. Some 25 years later, Cassini images showed that D72 had become significantly broader and more diffuse, and had moved planetward by 200 km (100 miles).

Present in the D Ring is a finescale structure with waves 30 km (20 miles) apart. First seen in the gap between the C Ring and D73, the structure was found during Saturn's 2009 equinox to extend a radial distance of 19,000 km (12,000 miles) from the D Ring to the inner edge of the B Ring. The waves are interpreted as a spiral pattern of vertical corrugations of 2 to 20 m amplitude; the fact that the period of the waves is decreasing over time (from 60 km; 40 miles in 1995 to 30 km; 20 miles by 2006) allows a deduction that the pattern may have originated in late 1983 with the impact of a cloud of debris (with a mass of ≈1012 kg) from a disrupted comet that tilted the rings out of the equatorial plane. A similar spiral pattern in Jupiter's main ring has been attributed to a perturbation caused by impact of material from Comet Shoemaker-Levy 9 in 1994.

C Ring 

The C Ring is a wide but faint ring located inward of the B Ring. It was discovered in 1850 by William and George Bond, though William R. Dawes and Johann Galle also saw it independently. William Lassell termed it the "Crepe Ring" because it seemed to be composed of darker material than the brighter A and B Rings.

Its vertical thickness is estimated at 5 metres (16'), its mass at around 1.1 kg, and its optical depth varies from 0.05 to 0.12. That is, between 5 and 12 percent of light shining perpendicularly through the ring is blocked, so that when seen from above, the ring is close to transparent. The 30-km wavelength spiral corrugations first seen in the D Ring were observed during Saturn's equinox of 2009 to extend throughout the C Ring (see above).

Colombo Gap and Titan Ringlet 
The Colombo Gap lies in the inner C Ring. Within the gap lies the bright but narrow Colombo Ringlet, centered at 77,883 km (48,394 miles) from Saturn's center, which is slightly elliptical rather than circular. This ringlet is also called the Titan Ringlet as it is governed by an orbital resonance with the moon Titan. At this location within the rings, the length of a ring particle's apsidal precession is equal to the length of Titan's orbital motion, so that the outer end of this eccentric ringlet always points towards Titan.

Maxwell Gap and Ringlet 
The Maxwell Gap lies within the outer part of the C Ring. It also contains a dense non-circular ringlet, the Maxwell Ringlet. In many respects this ringlet is similar to the ε ring of Uranus. There are wave-like structures in the middle of both rings. While the wave in the ε ring is thought to be caused by Uranian moon Cordelia, no moon has been discovered in the Maxwell gap as of July 2008.

B Ring 
The B Ring is the largest, brightest, and most massive of the rings. Its thickness is estimated as 5 to 15 m and its optical depth varies from 0.4 to greater than 5, meaning that >99% of the light passing through some parts of the B Ring is blocked. The B Ring contains a great deal of variation in its density and brightness, nearly all of it unexplained. These are concentric, appearing as narrow ringlets, though the B Ring does not contain any gaps. In places, the outer edge of the B Ring contains vertical structures deviating up to 2.5 km (1½ miles) from the main ring plane, a significant deviation from the vertical thickness of the main A, B and C rings, which is generally only about 10 meters (about 30 feet). Vertical structures can be created by unseen embedded moonlets.

A 2016 study of spiral density waves using stellar occultations indicated that the B Ring's surface density is in the range of 40 to 140 g/cm2, lower than previously believed, and that the ring's optical depth has little correlation with its mass density (a finding previously reported for the A and C rings). The total mass of the B Ring was estimated to be somewhere in the range of 7 to  kg. This compares to a mass for Mimas of  kg.

Spokes 

Until 1980, the structure of the rings of Saturn was explained as being caused exclusively by the action of gravitational forces. Then images from the Voyager spacecraft showed radial features in the B Ring, known as spokes, which could not be explained in this manner, as their persistence and rotation around the rings was not consistent with gravitational orbital mechanics. The spokes appear dark in backscattered light, and bright in forward-scattered light (see images in Gallery); the transition occurs at a phase angle near 60°. The leading theory regarding the spokes' composition is that they consist of microscopic dust particles suspended away from the main ring by electrostatic repulsion, as they rotate almost synchronously with the magnetosphere of Saturn. The precise mechanism generating the spokes is still unknown, although it has been suggested that the electrical disturbances might be caused by either lightning bolts in Saturn's atmosphere or micrometeoroid impacts on the rings.

The spokes were not observed again until some twenty-five years later, this time by the Cassini space probe. The spokes were not visible when Cassini arrived at Saturn in early 2004. Some scientists speculated that the spokes would not be visible again until 2007, based on models attempting to describe their formation. Nevertheless, the Cassini imaging team kept looking for spokes in images of the rings, and they were next seen in images taken on 5 September 2005.

The spokes appear to be a seasonal phenomenon, disappearing in the Saturnian midwinter and midsummer and reappearing as Saturn comes closer to equinox. Suggestions that the spokes may be a seasonal effect, varying with Saturn's 29.7-year orbit, were supported by their gradual reappearance in the later years of the Cassini mission.

Moonlet 
In 2009, during equinox, a moonlet embedded in the B ring was discovered from the shadow it cast. It is estimated to be  in diameter. The moonlet was given the provisional designation S/2009 S 1.

Cassini Division 

The Cassini Division is a region  in width between Saturn's A Ring and B Ring. It was discovered in 1675 by Giovanni Cassini at the Paris Observatory using a refracting telescope that had a 2.5-inch objective lens with a 20-foot-long focal length and a 90x magnification. From Earth it appears as a thin black gap in the rings. However, Voyager discovered that the gap is itself populated by ring material bearing much similarity to the C Ring. The division may appear bright in views of the unlit side of the rings, since the relatively low density of material allows more light to be transmitted through the thickness of the rings (see second image in gallery).

The inner edge of the Cassini Division is governed by a strong orbital resonance. Ring particles at this location orbit twice for every orbit of the moon Mimas. The resonance causes Mimas' pulls on these ring particles to accumulate, destabilizing their orbits and leading to a sharp cutoff in ring density. Many of the other gaps between ringlets within the Cassini Division, however, are unexplained.

Huygens Gap 
The Huygens Gap is located at the inner edge of the Cassini Division. It contains the dense, eccentric Huygens Ringlet in the middle. This ringlet exhibits irregular azimuthal variations of geometrical width and optical depth, which may be caused by the nearby 2:1 resonance with Mimas and the influence of the eccentric outer edge of the B-ring. There is an additional narrow ringlet just outside the Huygens Ringlet.

A Ring 

The A Ring is the outermost of the large, bright rings. Its inner boundary is the Cassini Division and its sharp outer boundary is close to the orbit of the small moon Atlas. The A Ring is interrupted at a location 22% of the ring width from its outer edge by the Encke Gap. A narrower gap 2% of the ring width from the outer edge is called the Keeler Gap.

The thickness of the A Ring is estimated to be 10 to 30 m, its surface density from 35 to 40 g/cm2 and its total mass as 4 to  kg (just under the mass of Hyperion). Its optical depth varies from 0.4 to 0.9.

Similarly to the B Ring, the A Ring's outer edge is maintained by orbital resonances, albeit in this case a more complicated set. It is primarily acted on by the 7:6 resonance with Janus and Epimetheus, with other contributions from the 5:3 resonance with Mimas and various resonances with Prometheus and Pandora. Other orbital resonances also excite many spiral density waves in the A Ring (and, to a lesser extent, other rings as well), which account for most of its structure. These waves are described by the same physics that describes the spiral arms of galaxies. Spiral bending waves, also present in the A Ring and also described by the same theory, are vertical corrugations in the ring rather than compression waves.

In April 2014, NASA scientists reported observing the possible formative stage of a new moon near the outer edge of the A Ring.

Encke Gap 
The Encke Gap is a 325-km (200 mile) wide gap within the A ring, centered at a distance of 133,590 km (83,000 miles) from Saturn's center. It is caused by the presence of the small moon Pan, which orbits within it. Images from the Cassini probe have shown that there are at least three thin, knotted ringlets within the gap. Spiral density waves visible on both sides of it are induced by resonances with nearby moons exterior to the rings, while Pan induces an additional set of spiraling wakes (see image in gallery).

Johann Encke himself did not observe this gap; it was named in honour of his ring observations. The gap itself was discovered by James Edward Keeler in 1888. The second major gap in the A ring, discovered by Voyager, was named the Keeler Gap in his honor.

The Encke Gap is a gap because it is entirely within the A Ring. There was some ambiguity between the terms gap and division until the IAU clarified the definitions in 2008; before that, the separation was sometimes called the "Encke Division".

Keeler Gap 

The Keeler Gap is a 42-km (26 mile) wide gap in the A ring, approximately 250 km (150 miles) from the ring's outer edge. The small moon Daphnis, discovered 1 May 2005, orbits within it, keeping it clear. The moon's passage induces waves in the edges of the gap (this is also influenced by its slight orbital eccentricity). Because the orbit of Daphnis is slightly inclined to the ring plane, the waves have a component that is perpendicular to the ring plane, reaching a distance of 1500 m "above" the plane.

The Keeler gap was discovered by Voyager, and named in honor of the astronomer James Edward Keeler. Keeler had in turn discovered and named the Encke Gap in honor of Johann Encke.

Propeller moonlets 

In 2006, four tiny "moonlets" were found in Cassini images of the A Ring. The moonlets themselves are only about a hundred metres in diameter, too small to be seen directly; what Cassini sees are the "propeller"-shaped disturbances the moonlets create, which are several km (miles) across. It is estimated that the A Ring contains thousands of such objects. In 2007, the discovery of eight more moonlets revealed that they are largely confined to a 3,000 km (2000 mile) belt, about 130,000 km (80,000 miles) from Saturn's center, and by 2008 over 150 propeller moonlets had been detected. One that has been tracked for several years has been nicknamed Bleriot.

Roche Division 

The separation between the A ring and the F Ring has been named the Roche Division in honor of the French physicist Édouard Roche. The Roche Division should not be confused with the Roche limit which is the distance at which a large object is so close to a planet (such as Saturn) that the planet's tidal forces will pull it apart. Lying at the outer edge of the main ring system, the Roche Division is in fact close to Saturn's Roche limit, which is why the rings have been unable to accrete into a moon.

Like the Cassini Division, the Roche Division is not empty but contains a sheet of material. The character of this material is similar to the tenuous and dusty D, E, and G Rings. Two locations in the Roche Division have a higher concentration of dust than the rest of the region. These were discovered by the Cassini probe imaging team and were given temporary designations: R/2004 S 1, which lies along the orbit of the moon Atlas; and R/2004 S 2, centered at 138,900 km (86,300 miles) from Saturn's center, inward of the orbit of Prometheus.

F Ring 

The F Ring is the outermost discrete ring of Saturn and perhaps the most active ring in the Solar System, with features changing on a timescale of hours. It is located 3,000 km (2000 miles) beyond the outer edge of the A ring. The ring was discovered in 1979 by the Pioneer 11 imaging team. It is very thin, just a few hundred km (miles) in radial extent. While the traditional view has been that it is held together by two shepherd moons, Prometheus and Pandora, which orbit inside and outside it, recent studies indicate that only Prometheus contributes to the confinement. Numerical simulations suggest the ring was formed when Prometheus and Pandora collided with each other and were partially disrupted.

More recent closeup images from the Cassini probe show that the F Ring consists of one core ring and a spiral strand around it. They also show that when Prometheus encounters the ring at its apoapsis, its gravitational attraction creates kinks and knots in the F Ring as the moon 'steals' material from it, leaving a dark channel in the inner part of the ring (see video link and additional F Ring images in gallery). Since Prometheus orbits Saturn more rapidly than the material in the F ring, each new channel is carved about 3.2 degrees in front of the previous one.

In 2008, further dynamism was detected, suggesting that small unseen moons orbiting within the F Ring are continually passing through its narrow core because of perturbations from Prometheus. One of the small moons was tentatively identified as S/2004 S 6.

As of 2023, the clumpy structure of the ring "is thought to be caused by the presence of thousands of small parent bodies (1.0 to 0.1 km in size) that collide and produce dense strands of micrometre- to centimetre-sized particles that re-accrete over a few months onto the parent bodies in a steady-state regime."

Outer rings

Janus/Epimetheus Ring 
A faint dust ring is present around the region occupied by the orbits of Janus and Epimetheus, as revealed by images taken in forward-scattered light by the Cassini spacecraft in 2006. The ring has a radial extent of about 5,000 km (3000 miles). Its source is particles blasted off the moons' surfaces by meteoroid impacts, which then form a diffuse ring around their orbital paths.

G Ring 
The G Ring (see last image in gallery) is a very thin, faint ring about halfway between the F Ring and the beginning of the E Ring, with its inner edge about 15,000 km (10,000 miles) inside the orbit of Mimas. It contains a single distinctly brighter arc near its inner edge (similar to the arcs in the rings of Neptune) that extends about one-sixth of its circumference, centered on the half-km (500 yard) diameter moonlet Aegaeon, which is held in place by a 7:6 orbital resonance with Mimas. The arc is believed to be composed of icy particles up to a few m in diameter, with the rest of the G Ring consisting of dust released from within the arc. The radial width of the arc is about 250 km (150 miles), compared to a width of 9,000 km (6000 miles) for the G Ring as a whole. The arc is thought to contain matter equivalent to a small icy moonlet about a hundred m in diameter. Dust released from Aegaeon and other source bodies within the arc by micrometeoroid impacts drifts outward from the arc because of interaction with Saturn's magnetosphere (whose plasma corotates with Saturn's magnetic field, which rotates much more rapidly than the orbital motion of the G Ring). These tiny particles are steadily eroded away by further impacts and dispersed by plasma drag. Over the course of thousands of years the ring gradually loses mass, which is replenished by further impacts on Aegaeon.

Methone Ring Arc 
A faint ring arc, first detected in September 2006, covering a longitudinal extent of about 10 degrees is associated with the moon Methone. The material in the arc is believed to represent dust ejected from Methone by micrometeoroid impacts. The confinement of the dust within the arc is attributable to a 14:15 resonance with Mimas (similar to the mechanism of confinement of the arc within the G ring). Under the influence of the same resonance, Methone librates back and forth in its orbit with an amplitude of 5° of longitude.

Anthe Ring Arc 

A faint ring arc, first detected in June 2007, covering a longitudinal extent of about 20 degrees is associated with the moon Anthe. The material in the arc is believed to represent dust knocked off Anthe by micrometeoroid impacts. The confinement of the dust within the arc is attributable to a 10:11 resonance with Mimas. Under the influence of the same resonance, Anthe drifts back and forth in its orbit over 14° of longitude.

Pallene Ring 
A faint dust ring shares Pallene's orbit, as revealed by images taken in forward-scattered light by the Cassini spacecraft in 2006. The ring has a radial extent of about 2,500 km (1500 miles). Its source is particles blasted off Pallene's surface by meteoroid impacts, which then form a diffuse ring around its orbital path.

E Ring 

The E Ring is the second outermost ring and is extremely wide; it consists of many tiny (micron and sub-micron) particles of water ice with silicates, carbon dioxide and ammonia.  The E Ring is distributed between the orbits of Mimas and Titan. Unlike the other rings, it is composed of microscopic particles rather than macroscopic ice chunks. In 2005, the source of the E Ring's material was determined to be cryovolcanic plumes emanating from the "tiger stripes" of the south polar region of the moon Enceladus. Unlike the main rings, the E Ring is more than 2,000 km (1000 miles) thick and increases with its distance from Enceladus. Tendril-like structures observed within the E Ring can be related to the emissions of the most active south polar jets of Enceladus.

Particles of the E Ring tend to accumulate on moons that orbit within it. The equator of the leading hemisphere of Tethys is tinted slightly blue due to infalling material. The trojan moons Telesto, Calypso, Helene and Polydeuces are particularly affected as their orbits move up and down the ring plane. This results in their surfaces being coated with bright material that smooths out features.

Phoebe ring 

In October 2009, the discovery of a tenuous disk of material just interior to the orbit of Phoebe was reported. The disk was aligned edge-on to Earth at the time of discovery. This disk can be loosely described as another ring. Although very large (as seen from Earth, the apparent size of two full moons), the ring is virtually invisible. It was discovered using NASA's infrared Spitzer Space Telescope, and was seen over the entire range of the observations, which extended from 128 to 207 times the radius of Saturn, with calculations indicating that it may extend outward up to 300 Saturn radii and inward to the orbit of Iapetus at 59 Saturn radii.  The ring was subsequently studied using the WISE, Herschel and Cassini spacecraft; WISE observations show that it extends from at least between 50 and 100 to 270 Saturn radii (the inner edge is lost in the planet's glare). Data obtained with WISE indicate the ring particles are small; those with radii greater than 10 cm comprise 10% or less of the cross-sectional area.

Phoebe orbits the planet at a distance ranging from 180 to 250 radii. The ring has a thickness of about 40 radii. Because the ring's particles are presumed to have originated from impacts (micrometeoroid and larger) on Phoebe, they should share its retrograde orbit, which is opposite to the orbital motion of the next inner moon, Iapetus. This ring lies in the plane of Saturn's orbit, or roughly the ecliptic, and thus is tilted 27 degrees from Saturn's equatorial plane and the other rings. Phoebe is inclined by 5° with respect to Saturn's orbit plane (often written as 175°, due to Phoebe's retrograde orbital motion), and its resulting vertical excursions above and below the ring plane agree closely with the ring's observed thickness of 40 Saturn radii.

The existence of the ring was proposed in the 1970s by Steven Soter. The discovery was made by Anne J. Verbiscer and Michael F. Skrutskie (of the University of Virginia) and Douglas P. Hamilton (of the University of Maryland, College Park). The three had studied together at Cornell University as graduate students.

Ring material migrates inward due to reemission of solar radiation, with a speed inversely proportional to particle size; a 3 cm particle would migrate from the vicinity of Phoebe to that of Iapetus over the age of the Solar System. The material would thus strike the leading hemisphere of Iapetus. Infall of this material causes a slight darkening and reddening of the leading hemisphere of Iapetus (similar to what is seen on the Uranian moons Oberon and Titania) but does not directly create the dramatic two-tone coloration of that moon. Rather, the infalling material initiates a positive feedback thermal self-segregation process of ice sublimation from warmer regions, followed by vapor condensation onto cooler regions. This leaves a dark residue of "lag" material covering most of the equatorial region of Iapetus's leading hemisphere, which contrasts with the bright ice deposits covering the polar regions and most of the trailing hemisphere.

Possible ring system around Rhea 

Saturn's second largest moon Rhea has been hypothesized to have a tenuous ring system of its own consisting of three narrow bands embedded in a disk of solid particles. These putative rings have not been imaged, but their existence has been inferred from Cassini observations in November 2005 of a depletion of energetic electrons in Saturn's magnetosphere near Rhea. The Magnetospheric Imaging Instrument (MIMI) observed a gentle gradient punctuated by three sharp drops in plasma flow on each side of the moon in a nearly symmetric pattern. This could be explained if they were absorbed by solid material in the form of an equatorial disk containing denser rings or arcs, with particles perhaps several decimeters to approximately a meter in diameter. A more recent piece of evidence consistent with the presence of Rhean rings is a set of small ultraviolet-bright spots distributed in a line that extends three quarters of the way around the moon's circumference, within 2 degrees of the equator. The spots have been interpreted as the impact points of deorbiting ring material. However, targeted observations by Cassini of the putative ring plane from several angles have turned up nothing, suggesting that another explanation for these enigmatic features is needed.

Gallery

See also 
 Galileo Galilei – the first person to observe Saturn's rings, in 1610
 Christiaan Huygens – the first to propose that there was a ring surrounding Saturn, in 1655
 Giovanni Cassini – discovered the separation between the A and B rings (the Cassini Division), in 1675
 Édouard Roche – French astronomer who described how a satellite that comes within the Roche limit of Saturn could break up and form the rings

Notes

References

External links 

 Planetary Rings Node: Saturn's Ring System
 Saturn's Rings by NASA's Solar System Exploration
 Rings of Saturn nomenclature from the USGS planetary nomenclature page
 Biggest Ring Around Saturn Just Got Supersized (retrieved 2017-12-20 from Space.com)
 Everything a Curious Mind Should Know About Planetary Ring Systems with Dr Mark Showalter (Waseem Akhtar podcast with Mark Showalter)
 High-resolution animation by Seán Doran of the backlit rings
 High-resolution animation by Kevin M. Gill of a flyover of the outer B Ring at equinox (it starts getting less uniform after the first minute); see Rings album for more
 High-resolution animation by Nick Stevens of Saturn and its rings from an equatorial and a polar orbit, and from a dive below the rings; see listing for more

 
Saturn
16101001
Discoveries by Galileo Galilei
Articles containing video clips